Ovenden is a village near Halifax, West Yorkshire, England.

Ovenden may also refer to:

People
 Daniel Macmillan, Viscount Macmillan of Ovenden (born 1974), British fashion designer
 Katharine Macmillan, Viscountess Macmillan of Ovenden (1921–2017), British politician
 Annie Ovenden (born 1945), British fine artist
 Denys Ovenden (born 1922), artist
 Emily Ovenden, British musician and daughter of Annie and Graham Ovenden
 Graham Ovenden (born 1943), English painter, fine art photographer, writer and architect
 John Ovenden (1942–2018), British politician
 Julian Ovenden (born 1975), English television and film actor
 Keith Ovenden (born 1943), English novelist and biographer
 Mark Ovenden (born 1963), English writer
 Mark Ovenden (sportscaster), American broadcaster
 Richard Ovenden (born 1964), British author and librarian at the Bodleian Library
 Charles Ovenden (1846–1924), Irish Anglican priest, author, and Dean of St. Patrick's Cathedral, Dublin of the Church of Ireland
 Kevin Ovenden (born 1968), British, left-wing, political activist
 Prof Michael Ovenden (1926–1987), British astronomer

Other uses
 Ovenden railway station, a former railway station at Ovenden in West Yorkshire, England
 Ovenden's Mill, Polegate, a windmill in Sussex, England